Martín Alund and Horacio Zeballos won the final by defeating Nicholas Monroe and Simon Stadler 3–6, 6–2, [14–12].

Seeds

Draw

Draw

References
 Main Draw

Copa San Juan Gobierno - Doubles
2012 Doubles
Copa